Fireproofing is rendering something (structures, materials, etc.) resistant to fire, or incombustible; or material for use in making anything fire-proof. It is a passive fire protection measure. "Fireproof" or "fireproofing" can be used as a noun, verb or adjective; it may be hyphenated ("fire-proof").

Applying a certification listed fireproofing system to certain structures allows them to have a fire-resistance rating. The term "fireproofing" may be used in conjunction with standards, as reflected in common North American construction specifications. An item classed as fireproof is resistant in specified circumstances, and may burn or be rendered inoperable by fire exceeding the intensity or duration that it is designed to withstand.

Markets
 Commercial construction
 Residential construction
 Industrial construction
 Marine (ships)
 Offshore construction
 Aerodynamics
 Tunnel concrete walls and ceilings or linings
 Under- and above-ground mining operations

Applications
 Structural steel to keep below critical temperature ca. 540 °C
 Electrical circuits to keep critical electrical circuits below 140 °C so they stay operational
 Liquified petroleum gas containers to prevent a BLEVE (boiling liquid expanding vapour explosion)
 Vessel skirts and pipe bridges in an oil refinery or chemical plant to keep the structural steel below critical temperature ca. 540°
 Concrete linings of traffic tunnels
 Fireblocking: In a wood frame construction, gaps are created by joists or studs in floor or wall partitions. These hollow spaces allow fire to travel easily from one area to another. Fireblocks are installed internally to divide these areas into smaller intervals. Common materials used include solid lumber, plywood, OSB, Particle board, gypsum board, cement fiberboard, or glass fiber insulation batts.
 Firewall (construction) is a common method employed to separate a building into small units to restrict or delay the spread of fire from one section to the next. Fire walls usually extend the full length of a building, from foundation to roof.
 Fire barriers and fire partitions: They are similar to fire walls in operation; however, their height is limited to a single floor, from the slab of one floor to the underside of the next.
 Coatings, e.g. to fireproof wood.

History
Asbestos was one material historically used for fireproofing, either on its own, or together with binders such as cement, either in sprayed form or in pressed sheets, or as additives to a variety of materials and products, including fabrics for protective clothing and building materials. Because the material was later proven to cause cancer, a large removal-and-replacement industry has been established.

Endothermic materials have also been used to a large extent and are still in use today, such as gypsum, concrete and other cementitious products. More highly evolved versions of these are used in aerodynamics, intercontinental ballistic missiles (ICBMs) and re-entry vehicles, such as the Space Shuttles.

The use of these older materials has been standardised in "old" systems, such as those listed in BS476, DIN4102 and the National Building Code of Canada.

Fireproofing of structural steel 
In a building fire, structural steel loses strength as the temperature increases. In order to maintain the structural integrity of the steel frame, several fireproofing measurements are taken:
 restrictions on the amount of exposed steel set by building codes.
 encasing structural steel in brick masonry or concrete to delay exposure to high temperatures.
Historically, these masonry encasement methods use large amounts of heavy materials, thus greatly increasing the load to the steel frame. Newer materials and methods have been developed to resolve this issue. The following lists both older and newer methods of fireproofing steel beams (i-beams):
 complete encasement in concrete square column.
 wrapping the i-beam in a thin layer of metal lath and then covering it with gypsum plaster. This method is effective because gypsum plaster contains water crystals that are heat resistant.
 applying multiple layers of gypsum board around the i-beam.
 applying spray-on fireproofing around the i-beam. Also called spray-applied fire-resistive materials (SFRM) using air pressured spray gun, which can be made from gypsum plaster, mineral fibers mixed with inorganic binder or a cementitious formula using magnesium oxychloride cement.
 enclosing the i-beam in sheet metal and fill with loose insulation.
 hollow columns filled with liquid water or antifreeze. When part of the column is exposed to fire, the heat is dissipated throughout by the convection property of the liquid.
 encasing the i-beam in rigid concrete slab.
 a layer of suspended plaster ceiling isolating the i-beam

Alternative methods

Among the conventional materials, purpose-designed spray fireproofing plasters have become abundantly available the world over. The inorganic methods include:

 Gypsum plasters
 Cementitious plasters
 Fibrous plasters

The industry considers gypsum-based plasters to be "cementitious", even though these contain no Portland, or calcium aluminate cements. Cementitious plasters that contain Portland cement have been traditionally lightened by the use of inorganic lightweight aggregates, such as vermiculite and perlite.

Gypsum plasters have been lightened by using chemical additives to create bubbles that displace solids, thus reducing the bulk density. Also, lightweight polystyrene beads have been mixed into the plasters at the factory in an effort to reduce the density, which generally results in a more effective insulation at a lower cost. The resulting plaster has qualified to the A2 combustibility rating as per DIN4102. Fibrous plasters, containing either mineral wool, or ceramic fibres tend to simply entrain more air, thus displacing the heavy fibres. On-site cost reduction efforts, at times purposely contravening the requirements of the certification listing, can further enhance such displacement of solids. This has resulted in architects' specifying the use of on-site testing of proper densities to ensure the products installed meet the certification listings employed for each installed configuration, because excessively light inorganic fireproofing does not provide adequate protection and, thus, could be in violation of the listings.

Proprietary boards and sheets, made of gypsum, calcium silicate, vermiculite, perlite, mechanically-bonded composite boards made of punched sheet-metal and cellulose-reinforced concrete have all been used to clad items for increased fire resistance.

An alternative method to keep building steel below its softening temperature is to use liquid convection cooling in hollow structural members. This method was patented in the 19th century although the first prominent example was 89 years later.

Substandard

Money can be saved fraudulently by using apparently suitable fireproofing that is not built to the required standard. Such fraud can be prevented when documentation is required and checked to ensure that all installed configurations meet the certification standards. Possible cases include:

 Entraining too much air in inorganic systems, thus reducing densities below fire-tested, saving on materials and labour.
 Spraying inorganic fireproofing materials over through-penetrations and building joints that should be firestopped, not fireproofed. This practice negates fire-separation integrity. Firestops must precede spray fireproofing.
 Substitution of intumescent and/or endothermic fireproofing coatings by less expensive paints of similar appearance, sometimes in the packaging of the correct materials.
 The American and Canadian nuclear industries have, historically, not insisted on listing and approval use and compliance, on the basis of the use of accredited certification laboratories. This has allowed the use of Thermo-Lag 330-1, for which the basis of testing has been proven to be faulty, requiring millions of dollars of remedial work. The Thermo-Lag scandal came to light as a result of disclosures by American whistleblower Gerald W. Brown, who reported the deficiencies in fire testing to the Nuclear Regulatory Commission.  certification of fireproofing and firestopping remained optional for systems installed in nuclear power plants in Canada and the United States.
 Reuse of older materials from demolished buildings, in newer buildings.

Work staging

Spray fireproofing products have not been qualified to the thousands of firestop configurations, so they cannot be installed in conformance of a certification listing. Therefore, firestopping must precede fireproofing. Both need one another. If the structural steel is left without fireproofing, it can damage fire barriers and a building can collapse. If the barriers are not firestopped properly, fire and smoke can spread from one compartment to another.

Traffic tunnels

Traffic tunnels may be traversed by vehicles carrying flammable goods, such as petrol, liquefied petroleum gas and other hydrocarbons, which are known to cause a very rapid temperature rise and high ultimate temperatures in case of a fire (see the hydrocarbon curves in fire-resistance rating). Where hydrocarbon transports are permitted in tunnel construction and operations, accidental fires may occur, resulting in the need for fireproofing of traffic tunnels with concrete linings. Traffic tunnels are not ordinarily equipped with fire suppression means, such as fire sprinkler systems. It is very difficult to control hydrocarbon fires by active fire protection means, and it is expensive to equip an entire tunnel along its whole length for the eventuality of a hydrocarbon fire or a BLEVE.

Concrete exposed to hydrocarbon fires

Concrete cannot, by itself, withstand severe hydrocarbon fires. In the Channel Tunnel that connects the United Kingdom and France, an intense fire broke out and reduced the concrete lining in the undersea tunnel down to about 50 mm. In ordinary building fires, concrete typically achieves excellent fire-resistance ratings, unless it is too wet, which can cause it to crack and explode. For unprotected concrete, the sudden endothermic reaction of the hydrates and unbound humidity inside the concrete generates pressure high enough to spall off the concrete, which falls in small pieces on the floor of the tunnel. Humidity probes are inserted into all concrete slabs that undergo fire testing to test for this, even for the less severe building elements curve (DIN4102, ASTM E119, BS476, or ULC-S101). The need for fireproofing was demonstrated, among other fire protection measures, in the European "Eureka" Fire Tunnel Research Project, which gave rise to building codes for the trade to avoid the effects of such fires upon traffic tunnels. Cementitious spray fireproofing must be certification-listed and applied in the field as per that listing, using a hydrocarbon fire test curve such as the one used in UL1709.

Fireproof vaults

Fireproof vaults to protect important paper documents are usually built using concrete or masonry blocks as the primary building material. In the event of a fire, the chemically-bound water within the concrete or masonry blocks is forced into the vault chamber as steam, which soaks the paper documents to keep them from igniting. This steam also helps keep the temperature inside the vault chamber below the critical  threshold, which is the point at which information on paper documents is destroyed. The paper can later be remediated with a freeze drying process if the fire is extinguished before internal temperatures exceed . An alternate less expensive and time-consuming construction method is using dry insulating material.

This vault construction method is sufficient for paper documents, but the steam generated by concrete and masonry structures will destroy contents that are more sensitive to heat and moisture. Class 150) and magnetic media (such as data tapes) lose data above  (a.k.a. Class 125). Fireproof vaults built to meet the more stringent Class 125 requirement are called data-rated vaults.

All components of fireproof vaults must meet the fire protection rating of the vault itself, including doors, HVAC penetrations and cable penetrations.

See also

 BLEVE
 Brominated flame retardant
 Cable tray
 Channel tunnel
 Circuit integrity
 Compartmentalisation
 Construction
 Endothermic
 Fire
 Fire protection
 Fire-resistance rating
 Firestop
 Flame retardant
 Hydrates
 Intumescent
 Liquified petroleum gas
 Listing and approval use and compliance
 Passive fire protection
 Plaster
 Product certification
 Sodium silicate
 Fireproof banknote

References

External links

 National Fireproofing Contractors Association http://www.nfca-online.org/
 Structural Fire Protection - American Institute of Steel Construction https://www.aisc.org/globalassets/modern-steel/archives/2002/12/2002v12_fire.pdf
 Additional Fireproofing Methods https://www.thebalance.com/fireproofing-method-structural-members-845033
 NFPA Standards

Flame retardants
Passive fire protection